McBreen is a surname. Notable people with the surname include:

Chris McBreen (born 1972), New Zealand snooker player
Daniel McBreen (born 1977), Australian footballer and coach
Martin McBreen (died 1911), American saloonkeeper and criminal
Tom McBreen (born 1952), American swimmer